Scott Flippo is a state senator in Arkansas. A Republican, in 2021 he is majority leader in the Arkansas Senate. He has been in the state senate since 2015. He was born in Mountain Home, Arkansas, and graduated from Mountain Home High School. He now lives in Bull Shoals. He has a degree in Business Administration from the University of Arkansas and owns the Carefree Living assisted living center. He is a Methodist.

References

Living people
Republican Party Arkansas state senators
Year of birth missing (living people)